Monty Montgomery may refer to:

 Monty Montgomery (American football) (born 1973), former American football cornerback
 Monty Montgomery (baseball) (born 1946), retired American Major League Baseball pitcher
 Monty Montgomery (producer) (born 1963), American film producer, director, actor and screenwriter
 Monty Montgomery, a character in A Series of Unfortunate Events
 Chris Montgomery, American computer specialist